Øster Ulslev is a village in the southeast of the Danish island of Lolland. As of 2022, it has a population of 231.

References

Lolland
Cities and towns in Region Zealand
Guldborgsund Municipality